Fabricio Damián Núñez Lozano (born November 4, 1985), known as Fabricio Núñez, is a Uruguayan footballer. He last played for Luftëtari Gjirokastër.

Career

After four years of professional football in Uruguay (playing for River Plate and Cerro Largo), Núñez joined Argentine Primera División side Godoy Cruz for the 2010–11 season. In June 2011 he joined Unión de Santa Fe for the 2011–12 season.

References

External links
 Fabricio Damián Núñez Lozano – Argentine Primera statistics at Fútbol XXI  
 
 

1985 births
Living people
People from Mercedes, Uruguay
Uruguayan footballers
Uruguayan expatriate footballers
Club Atlético River Plate (Montevideo) players
Cerro Largo F.C. players
Godoy Cruz Antonio Tomba footballers
Uruguayan Primera División players
Argentine Primera División players
Expatriate footballers in Argentina
Association football forwards